Phan Don is a tambon (subdistrict) of Kumphawapi District, in Udon Thani Province, Thailand. In 2017 it had a total population of 17,410 people.

Administration

Central administration
The tambon is subdivided into 20 administrative villages (muban).

Local administration
The area of the subdistrict is shared by 2 local governments.
the subdistrict municipality (Thesaban Tambon) Phan Don (เทศบาลตำบลพันดอน)
the subdistrict municipality (Thesaban Tambon) Kong Phan Phan Don (เทศบาลตำบลกงพานพันดอน)

References

External links
Thaitambon.com on Phan Don
Phan Don municipality
Kong Phan Phan Don municipality

Tambon of Udon Thani Province
Populated places in Udon Thani province